Ibrahim Al-Nakhli (born 9 March 1997) is a Saudi Arabian professional footballer who plays as a defender for Saudi Professional League side Damac.

Career
Al-Nakhli started his career at the youth team of Al-Fateh and represented the club at every level. On 1 October 2020, Al-Nakhli joined Al-Thoqbah. On 20 July 2019, Al-Nakhli renew his contract with Al-Thoqbah. On 25 September 2020, Al-Nakhli joined Damac.

References

External links
 

1997 births
Living people
People from Medina
Saudi Arabian footballers
Association football defenders
Al-Fateh SC players
Al-Thoqbah Club players
Damac FC players
Saudi Second Division players
Saudi First Division League players
Saudi Professional League players
Saudi Arabian Shia Muslims